The Besta deild karla is the top level men's football league in Iceland. The competition was founded in 1912 as the Icelandic Championship. Because of the harsh winters in Iceland, it is generally played in the spring and summer (May to September). It is governed by the Football Association of Iceland (KSI) and has 12 teams. By end of season 2015–16, UEFA ranked the league No. 35 in Europe.

From 27 April 2009 to 2022, the league had an active agreement on the league's name rights with Ölgerðin, the Icelandic franchisee for Pepsi. From the 2019 season to the end of the 2021 season, the league was popularly referred to as Pepsi Max deildin (The Pepsi Max League). On 24 February 2022, the league was rebranded as Besta deild karla.

The clubs play each other home and away. At the end of each season, the two teams with the fewest points are relegated to 1. deild karla (First Division), from which two top point teams promote to the higher tier. The winner of the Úrvalsdeild enters the European national competition UEFA Champions League in the second qualifying round. The second, third and fourth placed teams qualify for the UEFA Europa League in the first qualifying round.

An effort by KSI to strengthen Icelandic football had only one team relegated in the 2007 season to the First Division and three clubs promoted to premier division, bringing the top flight to the number of clubs it contains currently.

Championship title counts are: KR with 27, Valur with 23, and ÍA and Fram Reykjavík each with 18. FH has 8 and Víkingur has 6. The 2022 title holder is Breidablik.

Current clubs (2023) 

Source:

History

Championship history 
The Icelandic league title has been won in its over 100 years existence by 11 teams. KR has the most titles, with 27. Stjarnan are the latest team to join the list, winning their first title in 2014.

The league has been dominated by teams from the Capital Region which contains nearly two thirds of Iceland's population. Only four teams from outside the GRA have ever won the league: (Keflavík, ÍA, ÍBV, and KA). ÍBV and KA have won four titles amongst themselves, are located more than an hour's drive from Reykjavík, and the teams of the longest distance from the capital to title.

Single Round
 1912: KR (Reykjavík)
 1913: Fram (Reykjavík)*
 1914: Fram (Reykjavík)*
 1915: Fram (Reykjavík)
 1916: Fram (Reykjavík)
 1917: Fram (Reykjavík)
 1918: Fram (Reykjavík)
 1919: KR (Reykjavík)
 1920: Víkingur (Reykjavík)
 1921: Fram (Reykjavík)
 1922: Fram (Reykjavík)
 1923: Fram (Reykjavík)
 1924: Víkingur (Reykjavík)
 1925: Fram (Reykjavík)
 1926: KR (Reykjavík)
 1927: KR (Reykjavík)
 1928: KR (Reykjavík)
 1929: KR (Reykjavík)
 1930: Valur (Reykjavík)
 1931: KR (Reykjavík)
 1932: KR (Reykjavík)
 1933: Valur (Reykjavík)
 1934: KR (Reykjavík)
 1935: Valur (Reykjavík)
 1936: Valur (Reykjavík)
 1937: Valur (Reykjavík)
 1938: Valur (Reykjavík)
 1939: Fram (Reykjavík)
 1940: Valur (Reykjavík)
 1941: KR (Reykjavík)
 1942: Valur (Reykjavík)
 1943: Valur (Reykjavík)
 1944: Valur (Reykjavík)
 1945: Valur (Reykjavík)
 1946: Fram (Reykjavík)
 1947: Fram (Reykjavík)
 1948: KR (Reykjavík)
 1949: KR (Reykjavík)
 1950: KR (Reykjavík)
 1951: ÍA (Akranes)
 1952: KR (Reykjavík)
 1953: ÍA (Akranes)
 1954: ÍA (Akranes)
 1955: KR (Reykjavík)
 1956: Valur (Reykjavík)
 1957: ÍA (Akranes)
 1958: ÍA (Akranes)
Double Round
 1959: KR (Reykjavík)
 1960: ÍA (Akranes)
 1961: KR (Reykjavík)
 1962: Fram (Reykjavík)
 1963: KR (Reykjavík)
 1964: Keflavík (Keflavík)
 1965: KR (Reykjavík)
 1966: Valur (Reykjavík)
 1967: Valur (Reykjavík)
 1968: KR (Reykjavík)
 1969: Keflavík (Keflavík)
 1970: ÍA (Akranes)
 1971: Keflavík (Keflavík)
 1972: Fram (Reykjavík)
 1973: Keflavík (Keflavík)
 1974: ÍA (Akranes)
 1975: ÍA (Akranes)
 1976: Valur (Reykjavík)
 1977: ÍA (Akranes)
 1978: Valur (Reykjavík)
 1979: ÍBV (Vestmannaeyjar)
 1980: Valur (Reykjavík)
 1981: Víkingur (Reykjavík)
 1982: Víkingur (Reykjavík)
 1983: ÍA (Akranes)
 1984: ÍA (Akranes)
 1985: Valur (Reykjavík)
 1986: Fram (Reykjavík)
 1987: Valur (Reykjavík)
 1988: Fram (Reykjavík)
 1989: KA (Akureyri)
 1990: Fram (Reykjavík)
 1991: Víkingur (Reykjavík)
 1992: ÍA (Akranes)
 1993: ÍA (Akranes)
 1994: ÍA (Akranes)
 1995: ÍA (Akranes)
 1996: ÍA (Akranes)
 1997: ÍBV (Vestmannaeyjar)
 1998: ÍBV (Vestmannaeyjar)
 1999: KR (Reykjavík)
 2000: KR (Reykjavík)
 2001: ÍA (Akranes)
 2002: KR (Reykjavík)
 2003: KR (Reykjavík)
 2004: FH (Hafnarfjörður)
 2005: FH (Hafnarfjörður)
 2006: FH (Hafnarfjörður)
 2007: Valur (Reykjavík)
 2008: FH (Hafnarfjörður)
 2009: FH (Hafnarfjörður)
 2010: Breiðablik (Kópavogur)
 2011: KR (Reykjavík)
 2012: FH (Hafnarfjörður)
 2013: KR (Reykjavík)
 2014: Stjarnan (Garðabær)
 2015: FH (Hafnarfjörður)
 2016: FH (Hafnarfjörður)
 2017: Valur (Reykjavík)
 2018: Valur (Reykjavík)
 2019: KR (Reykjavík)
 2020: Valur (Reykjavík)**
 2021: Víkingur (Reykjavík)
 2022: Breiðablik (Kópavogur)

*There was no competition in 1913 and 1914, and Fram was awarded the title.
**In 2020 the competition got cut short due to the COVID-19 pandemic and Valur was awarded the title because they were at the top of the table when the season ended.

Champions by number of titles

Season by season records

All-time top scorers

Top scorers

Player of the Year

Young Player of the Year 
Caps correct as of 27 September 2022

Total seasons in Besta deild by club
A total of 30 teams have played at least one season in the top division.
Teams in bold play in 2023 season.

Seasons counted up to and including the 2023 season

1 ÍBA stood for "Sports Association of Akureyri", composed of KA and Þór. Disbanded after the 1974 season with KA and Þór fielding their own teams starting from the 1975 season.
2 ÍBH stood for "Sports Association of Hafnarfjörður", composed of FH and Haukar. Disbanded after the 1963 season with FH and Haukar fielding their own teams starting from the 1964 season.
3 ÍBÍ ran into financial trouble and folded after the 1987 season. Most of the players transferred to BÍ which took over as the main football club in Ísafjörður. BÍ is now known as Vestri.
4 Leiftur ran into financial trouble and eventually merged with KS from Siglufjörður before the 2006 season. The teams were disbanded before the 2010 season in favour of forming a new football club for both towns, the new club being called KF.

See also

Besta deild kvenna  (Women's Premier League)
List of football clubs in Iceland
List of foreign Úrvalsdeild players

References

External links 
  
 League321.com - Icelandic football league tables, records & statistics database. 
 Iceland - List of Champions, RSSSF.com
 IcelandFootball.net - List of First Level Champions. 
 SOCCERWAY - Úrvalsdeild  summary

 
1
Iceland
Summer association football leagues
1912 establishments in Iceland
Sports leagues established in 1912
Professional sports leagues in Iceland